The Trophée des Champions is a Super Cup in handball created in March 2010 by the Ligue Nationale de Handball, the main body of French handball. The competition usually takes place at the beginning of September a few days before the championship resumes and is therefore the first official match of the season.

The Women's Handball League does not organize an equivalent competition for women.

References

See also 
 LNH
 Division 1
 Coupe de France

Handball competitions in France
Recurring sporting events established in 2002